The 1958 Roller Hockey World Cup was the thirteenth roller hockey world cup, organized by the Fédération Internationale de Patinage a Roulettes (now under the name of Fédération Internationale de Roller Sports). It was contested by 10 national teams (all from Europe) and marks the first time that a world championship was not considered a European championship. All the games were played in the city of Porto, in Portugal, the chosen city to host the World Cup.

Results

Standings

See also
 FIRS Roller Hockey World Cup

External links
 1958 World Cup in rink-hockey.net historical database

Roller Hockey World Cup
International roller hockey competitions hosted by Portugal
1958 in Portuguese sport
1958 in roller hockey